Sašo Gjoreski (born 18 September 1982) is a Macedonian retired football player.

The defender last played for FK Bregalnica Štip.

Club career
He was born in Sombor, SR Serbia, back then within Yugoslavia. He has also played for top Albanian side KF Tirana during the 2008–2009 season, making 11 league appearances

References

External links 
 
 

1982 births
Living people
Sportspeople from Ohrid
Macedonians of Serbia
Association football defenders
Macedonian footballers
FK Sileks players
FC Zbrojovka Brno players
FK Rabotnički players
KF Tirana players
KS Shkumbini Peqin players
FK Ohrid players
FK 11 Oktomvri players
FK Bregalnica Štip players
FK Mladost Carev Dvor players
Macedonian First Football League players
Czech First League players
Kategoria Superiore players
Macedonian expatriate footballers
Expatriate footballers in the Czech Republic
Macedonian expatriate sportspeople in the Czech Republic
Expatriate footballers in Albania
Macedonian expatriate sportspeople in Albania
Sportspeople from Sombor